Vallo di Nera is a comune (municipality) in the Province of Perugia in the Italian region Umbria, located about 60 km southeast of Perugia.

References

External links
 Official website

Cities and towns in Umbria